"Expo 2000" is a song by Kraftwerk. It was originally an a cappella jingle commissioned for the Hannover Expo 2000 world's fair in Germany, which was subsequently developed into longer pieces with music and additional lyrics. It was the group's first commercial recording of new, original music since the release of the 1986 album Electric Café.

The Expo 2000 single was first released on CD and twelve-inch vinyl in December 1999 by EMI in Germany and in January 2000 elsewhere in Europe. It reached #27 in the UK singles chart in March 2000.

In November 2000, a collection of remixes was released, titled Expo Remix, featuring contributions from various producers, including long-term collaborator François Kevorkian, Orbital, and members of the Detroit techno collective Underground Resistance.  Both releases were combined and issued on one CD by Astralwerks Records in the US and Canada in October 2001.

"Expo 2000" was later reworked to remove all Expo references and subsequently titled "Planet of Visions" (German: "Planet der Visionen"). This reworked version has been played live extensively on all Kraftwerk tours since. It is featured on the live releases Minimum-Maximum and 3-D The Catalogue. On the latter, it is featured as part of The Mix disc.
The song can be heard in the 2001 Kollaboration 2001 viral video featuring Mike Song and David Elsewhere.

Jingle
The original Expo theme was a typically Kraftwerk vocoder-voice singing the phrase "Expo 2000" in six languages: German, English, French, Russian, Spanish, Japanese. In total, the piece lasted thirty seconds.  This "Expo-Jingle" was only available for download from the Expo 2000 website for a limited period and on the limited edition official Expo 2000 souvenir CD.

The jingle was used during the Expo 2000 world's fair, according to the official Expo 2000 website, "to announce Expo stops in buses, trains or planes, when prizes and awards are presented, at press conferences, during radio and television broadcasts, as a welcoming tune on the internet, as music on hold for the Expo Call Center, or when performances begin and as an intermission signal at Expo events."

There was criticism in Germany at the time about the size of the fee paid — 400,000 DM (which would have been approximately €204,500 in 1999) — for such a brief and simple piece of music.

— Ralf Hütter

Track listing

Expo 2000

Expo Remix

Charts

Weekly charts

References 

Kraftwerk songs
Songs written by Florian Schneider
Songs written by Ralf Hütter
1999 songs
Expo 2000
World's fair music
Jingles
Songs based on jingles
EMI Records singles
Astralwerks singles